Baron de Richemont (c. 1785;10 August 1853) was one of several claimants to be Louis XVII, the Dauphin who died during the French Revolution.

His real identity was probably either Henri Hebert (born 1788) or Claude Perrin (born 1786).

Richemont was in prison in Milan for seven years and began to put forward his claims in Paris in 1828. In 1833, he was again arrested, was brought to trial in the following year and condemned to twelve years' imprisonment.  To complicate matters, at one point during his trial a letter was read out from Karl Wilhelm Naundorff, arguably the best known Louis XVII claimant.  He escaped after a few months and left the country, to return in 1840. He died at Gleizé, the name of Louis Charles de France being inscribed on his tomb until the government ordered its removal.

Sources

Jean de Bonnefon, Le baron de Richemont, fils de Louis XVI
Henri Gisquet, Mémoires de M. Gisquet, ancien préfet de police, écrits par lui-même, t. III, Paris, Marchant, 1840, p. 34-53.
Joseph-Marie Quérard, Les Supercheries littéraires dévoilées, t. III, Paris, 1850, p. 69-121.
Armand Fouquier, Causes célèbres de tous les peuples, t. II, no 38 (« Les Faux dauphins »), Paris, 1859.
Rene Le Conte, Louis XVII et les faux Dauphins

1780s births
1853 deaths
People from Lagnieu
Louis XVII impostors
Year of birth missing
Prisoners and detainees of Austria
Escapees from French detention